Troy Gray (born 26 February 1973) is an Australian television producer, presenter and former Australian Football League (AFL) player. He played with the Sydney Swans and the St Kilda Football Club. Gray has created a number of global television formats and has won several awards for his TV work.

Originally from Canberra, Gray played with the Swans for five league seasons. He kicked four goals against the Brisbane Bears at the SCG in just his third AFL game. His best season was in 1995 when he appeared in 19 of the 22 rounds, playing as a defender.

Gray was traded to St Kilda after the season ended, in exchange for the 34th pick of the national draft, which was used on Shannon Corcoran. In the opening round of the 1997 AFL season, against Hawthorn, Gray had 22 disposals and kicked two goals.

He has since been involved in television and radio, and presented the news on the Nine Network. Gray's latest TV success is the award-winning television series Adventure All Stars (produced by the company he founded, Charity TV Global). This ground-breaking travel TV show is broadcast in 25 countries and has an alliance with Outdoor Channel Asia.

References

External links
 
 
 
 

1973 births
Living people
Australian rules footballers from the Australian Capital Territory
Sydney Swans players
St Kilda Football Club players
Australian rules football commentators
Australian television presenters
New South Wales Australian rules football State of Origin players